Stupid Boy is a 2004 film directed by Lionel Baier.

Plot
This French language film tells the story of 20-year-old Loic, who works by day in a chocolate factory, and by night cruises the internet for sex with older men. His life is a series of pointless anonymous sexual encounters until he meets one man who appears to be interested in him for himself, and not just his body.

Loic's journey to self-awareness is told through a series of episodic events, such as the suicide of his best friend, his growing infatuation with a local team's soccer star, a car accident and subsequent hospitalisation which uncomfortably reunites him with his parents. At the end of the film he realizes that he can be his own person and he recites a list of things he will never do in order to fit in and belong.

Cast
Pierre Chatagny as Loïc
Natacha Koutchoumov as Marie
Rui Pedro Alves as Rui
Lionel Baier as Lionel

References

External links

2004 films
2004 comedy-drama films
Swiss LGBT-related films
2000s French-language films
LGBT-related drama films
2004 LGBT-related films
Gay-related films
2004 comedy films
2004 drama films
Swiss comedy-drama films
French-language Swiss films